Stinkor is a fictional character, a villain from He-Man and the Masters of the Universe. Labeled the "Evil Master of Odors," Stinkor is essentially a humanoid skunk whose superpower is the ability to release a toxic odor from his body that renders foes immobile.

Conception

1985
Stinkor was first introduced in 1985 as an action figure from the He-Man and the Masters of the Universe toyline and came packaged with a mini-comic entitled The Stench of Evil!. The Stinkor action figure had a semi-foul scent, giving it the distinction of being one of the few toys whose "action feature" was an odor. The Stinkor action figure was created by Mattel by re-using the mold of another villain in the Masters of the Universe line Mer-Man. The only differences between the Mer-Man and Stinkor action figures were that Stinkor was painted black and white, had different chest armor and was chemically treated with patchouli oil to smell musky.

Stinkor was presented to Lou Scheimer and other staff at Filmation for inclusion in the original Masters of the Universe cartoon series, but his questionable superpower kept him from ever making an appearance on television. According to Filmation staff, when the description of Stinkor was read out at a meeting of the story editors, all of them burst out laughing and vowed never to use Stinkor in any episode script.

2002
In the 2002 version of the He-Man cartoon, Stinkor's origin was finally revealed in The Sweet Smell of Victory episode, marking the first time the character had appeared on television. Stinkor was originally a common thief named Odiphus and resembled a large house cat or mogwai. Odiphus was first seen witnessing the escape of Kobra Khan. Later on, Odiphus sought to join Skeletor's group. A chemical accident in Tri-Klops' lab mutated Odiphus into Stinkor and gave him his horrible stench. Stinkor is not immune to his own stench and must wear an oxygen mask to breathe properly. Stinkor eventually incorporated into his breathing apparatus a way to control his stench into focused blasts and teamed up with Skeletor against He-Man and the other Masters of the Universe. As it turns out as difficult as Stinkor is to be around, Skeletor eventually holds him in relatively high favor as a minion who has proved himself agreeably useful.

In the show's second season, the episode "Out of the Past" revealed further background to Stinkor's character. In a flashback sequence we saw Odiphus as a young boy, and it was revealed he was from a race of creatures called the Pelezeans who populate a small village called Pelezea. Odiphus had desired to be a criminal ever since his childhood and as a child betrayed his people by telling the invading warlord Prahvus where the Pelezean kept their weapons. This did get Odiphus punished after a disguised Sorceress of Castle Grayskull repelled Prahvus' forces. In the present, Stinkor suggested to Skeletor to send his skeleton warriors to Pelezea.

Reception
Stinkor has had a mixed reception from critics and fans. Stinkor was voted No. 30 in 'The 36 Worst Action Figures From Iconic Toy Lines' by Cracked. Stinkor was voted No. 7 in 'The 12 Coolest Masters of the Universe Action Features' by Topless Robot. CBR voted Stinkor 6th-worst He-Man toy.

References

Villains in animated television series
Extraterrestrial supervillains
Fictional commanders
Fictional mutants
Fictional skunks
Fictional warlords
Masters of the Universe Evil Warriors
Television characters introduced in 1985
Male characters in animated series